Richard Hachiro (born 27 January 1998) is a Zimbabwean footballer who plays as a midfielder for CAPS and the Zimbabwe national football team.

Career

Club
Hachiro began his senior club career with Herentals F.C. in 2017. In February 2020, Hachiro moved to CAPS United for an undisclosed fee.

International
Hachiro made his senior international debut on 18 April 2018, coming on as a 47th-minute substitute for Winston Mhango in a 1-0 friendly defeat to Botswana.

Career statistics

International

References

External links

1998 births
Living people
CAPS United players
Zimbabwe Premier Soccer League players
Zimbabwean footballers
Zimbabwe international footballers
Association football midfielders
Zimbabwe A' international footballers
2020 African Nations Championship players